The Dutch Indoor Athletics Championships is an annual indoor track and field competition organised by the Royal Dutch Athletics Federation, which serves as the national championship for the sport in the Netherlands. Typically held over two to three days in February during the Dutch winter, it was first added to the national calendar in 1969, supplementing the main outdoor Dutch Athletics Championships held in the summer since 1910.

Events
The following athletics events feature as standard on the Dutch Indoor Championships programme:

 Sprint: 60 m, 200 m, 400 m
 Distance track events: 800 m, 1500 m, 3000 m
 Hurdles: 60 m hurdles
 Jumps: long jump, triple jump, high jump, pole vault
 Throws: shot put
 Combined events: heptathlon (men), pentathlon (women)

The 200 m was introduced in 1982, and was briefly removed from the programme from 2006–10 before being reintroduced. Combined events was first held in 1976. Racewalking is longer contested but men previously competed in the 3000 metres race walk and 5000 metres race walk until it was dropped in 2007. The women's programme expanded in line with changes at international level. A women's 1500 metres was added in 1972, followed by a 3000 metres in 1979. The fields events were also increased to match the men's schedule, with triple jump being first held in 1991 and pole vault in 1996.

Editions

Championships records

Men

Women

References

External links
Royal Dutch Athletics Federation official website

 
Athletics competitions in the Netherlands
National indoor athletics competitions
Recurring sporting events established in 1969
1969 establishments in the Netherlands
February sporting events